Mahmoud Omeirat Charr, previously known as Manuel Charr, is a German professional boxer who held the WBA (Regular) heavyweight title from 2017 to 2021, and challenged for the WBC heavyweight title in 2012. Charr has a knockout-to-win percentage of 58%.

Early life
Mahmoud started his martial arts career with Thai boxing at the age of 17. Two years later he became the youngest ever German Champion in Muay Thai. In 2005 he became the German Champion and the European Champion in Thai-Boxing at the age of 19. Due to his track record in Thai-Boxing, in 2000 Mahmoud was invited to a training camp for professional boxers at the famous Max Schmeling Gym in Berlin. Here his professional boxing career started under the supervision of the famous German boxing coach Ulli Wegner.

Amateur boxing
2002 TeutoCup Champion (Germany)
2003 District Champion (Germany)
2004 Westfahlen Champion (Germany) 
2004 Western German Champion

Professional boxing
After compiling a perfect record of 21-0, Charr fought WBC heavyweight champion Vitali Klitschko on September 8, 2012 in Moscow, Russia. Charr was knocked down in the second round with a right hook, and he lost the bout by fourth-round technical knockout when it was stopped due to a cut received as a result of Klitschko's punches. Charr strongly protested the stoppage but the decision remained the same, giving Charr the first defeat of his professional career.

Charr defended his WBC International Silver heavyweight title against Yakup Saglam in Galaţi, Romania on February 22, 2013.

He turned up to the post-fight press conference of the David Haye vs. Derek Chisora fight on 14 July 2012 in order to challenge the victorious Haye. Charr and Haye agreed to fight at Manchester Arena on 29 June 2013, but on 14 May, Haye pulled out due to a hand injury sustained in training. Haye went on to agree to fight undefeated Tyson Fury instead on 28 September, but that bout was also cancelled.

Charr improved his record to 26-1 with wins over Oleksiy Mazikin, Dennis Bakhtov and Kevin Johnson, before challenging highly-ranked Alexander Povetkin on 30 May 2014 for the vacant WBC International title in Moscow, Russia. Charr lost the bout by seventh-round knockout, suffering his second career loss.

Charr's fight against Povetkin was the first of five consecutive bouts that subsequently took place in Russia, the last of which was a brutal one-punch fifth-round knockout defeat to Mairis Breidis on 22 August 2015 in Grozny, Chechnya.

After improving to 30-4, Charr faced Alexander Ustinov for the vacant WBA (Regular) title in Oberhausen, Germany on 25 November 2017, and won by unanimous decision. Despite the "Regular" title being secondary to the WBA's "Super" title which at the time was held by Anthony Joshua, the victory nonetheless meant that Charr was the first German heavyweight world champion in 85 years.

A few days before Charr was scheduled to defend his WBA (Regular) title against Fres Oquendo in September 2018, Charr tested positive for drostanolone and trenbolone, and as a result the fight was cancelled. 

In January 2021, Charr was stripped of his WBA (Regular) title due to inactivity. More than 3 years since he last fought, Charr returned to the ring on 15 May 2021 and recorded his 32nd career victory, with a second-round knockout of undefeated Christopher Lovejoy.

Personal life
In 2015, an altercation at a kebab shop in Essen, Germany led to a drive-by shooting which left Charr shot four times in the abdomen and forced to undergo emergency surgery that night to save his life. Charr was dining with rapper Kay One at the time of the incident, which occurred following an argument with an online troll who had been abusing the boxer for some weeks. The perpetrator, whom Charr identified to police, turned himself in to the police. Charr underwent double-hip replacement surgery in May 2017.

Professional boxing record

References

External links 
 
 

Year of birth missing (living people)
Date of birth missing (living people)
Living people
Heavyweight boxers
Sportspeople from Beirut
World Boxing Association champions
World heavyweight boxing champions
German people of Lebanese descent
German people of Syrian descent
Lebanese emigrants to Germany
Naturalized citizens of Germany